The Red Church is a Byzantine church from  in the village of Vourgareli in the Tzoumerka region of Greece.

It was founded as the katholikon of a monastery by the brothers John and Theodore Tzimiskes, who held the rank of protostrator. The church was originally dedicated to the birth of the Theotokos, but became known as the "Red Church" due to the colour of its masonry. Historically, it was also known as "Panagia of Vella" (Παναγία Βελλάς), as it was a metochi of the Vella Monastery, and as "Royal Monastery" (Βασιλομονάστηρο), due to its importance.

References

Byzantine church buildings in Epirus (region)
Despotate of Epirus
13th-century Eastern Orthodox church buildings
Churches completed in the 1280s
13th-century churches in Greece